New Bongaigaon Junction is a major railway junction station of Barauni–Guwahati line, and New Bongaigaon–Jogihopa–Kamakhya line of Northeast Frontier Railway. The one and only railway station in India which is located over a river named Tunia. It is the largest railway station with Carriage & Wagon Workshop in Rangiya railway division.

History
Construction of the -long  broad gauge Siliguri–Jogihopa line, between 1963 and 1965, brought broad-gauge railways to Assam. It also was the reason for setting up the New Bongaigaon railway station.

New railway track from New Bongaigaon to Guwahati was commissioned in 1984.

Saraighat Bridge opened in 1962, initially carried a metre-gauge track, which was later replaced by broad gauge.

Electrification
Electrification of the Barauni–Katihar–Guwahati line was sanctioned in 2008. In the document on Vision 2020 – A Blue Print for Railway Electrification Programme, in the list of ongoing projects the entire route km (836) is shown as balance work as on 1 April 2010. The entire electrification project is scheduled to be completed by 2022.

Track doubling
Doubling of the track between New Bongaigaon and Kamakhya via Rangia has been approved in the Railway Budget for 2013–14.

Amenities
New Bongaigaon has two double-bedded retiring rooms, computerized railway reservation system, waiting room and vegetarian and non vegetarian food stalls.

Workshop
The Carriage and Wagon Workshop is located about 2 km west of New Bongaigaon railway station. It was set up in sixties and has maintenance, as well as manufacturing facilities.

Gallery

Major Trains 
 Dibrugarh - New Delhi Rajdhani Express (Via New Tinsukia)
 Dibrugarh - New Delhi Rajdhani Express (Via Moranhat)
 Dibrugarh - New Delhi Rajdhani Express (Via Rangapara North)
Agartala - Sir M. Visvesvaraya Terminal Humsafar Express
Naharlagun - Anand Vihar Terminal AC Superfast Express
Kamakhya - Lokmanya Tilak Terminus AC Superfast Express
Kamakhya - Sir M. Visvesvaraya Terminal AC Superfast Express
Guwahati - New Delhi Poorvattar Sampark Kranti Superfast Express
Silchar–New Delhi Poorvottar Sampark Kranti Superfast Express
Silchar - Thiruvananthapuram Aronai Superfast Express
Silchar - Coimbatore Superfast Express
Silchar - Sealdah Kanchanjunga Express
Dibrugarh–Kanyakumari Vivek Express
Dibrugarh– Chennai Tambaram Express
Dibrugarh–Amritsar Express
Dibrugarh–Chandigarh Express
Dibrugarh - Lokmanya Tilak Terminus Superfast Express
Dibrugarh-Lalgarh Avadh Assam Express
Dibrugarh–Kolkata Superfast Express
Dibrugarh-Howrah Kamrup Express via Guwahati
Dibrugarh–Howrah Kamrup Express Via Rangapara North
Dibrugarh - Jhajha Express
Silghat Town - Tambaram Nagaon Express
Silghat Town - Kolkata Kaziranga Express
Agartala - Firozpur Tripura Sundari Express
Agartala - Deoghar Weekly Express
Agartala - Sealdah Kanchanjunga Express
New Tinsukia–Bengaluru Weekly Express
New Tinsukia–Rajendra Nagar Weekly Express
New Tinsukia - Darbhanga Jivachh Link Express
Guwahati - Jammu Tawi Lohit Express
Guwahati- Sir M. Visvesvaraya Terminal Kaziranga Superfast Express
Guwahati - Bikaner Express
Guwahati - Okha Dwarka Express
Guwahati - Barmer Express
Guwahati–Secunderabad Express
Guwahati-Jammu Tawi Amarnath Express
Guwahati - Lokmanya Tilak Terminus Express
Guwahati-Howrah Saraighat Superfast Express
Guwahati - Kolkata Garib Rath Express
Kamakhya–Shri Mata Vaishno Devi Katra Express
Kamakhya–Gandhidham Superfast Express
Kamakhya - Lokmanya Tilak Terminus Karmabhoomi Express.
Kamakhya - Udaipur City Kavi Guru Express
Kamakhya - Jodhpur, Bhagat Ki Kothi Express
Kamakhya - Delhi Brahmaputra Mail
Kamakhya - Dr. Ambedkar Nagar Express
Kamakhya - Ranchi Express
Kamakhya - Puri Express via Howrah
Kamakhya - Puri Express (via Adra)
Kamakhya–Gaya Express
Kamakhya–Anand Vihar Express
Kamakhya - Delhi Northeast Express
Kamakhya - Gomti Nagar Express
Kamakhya - Rajendra Nagar Terminal Capital Express
Kamakhya - Alipurduar Intercity Express
New Jalpaiguri - Bongaigaon Express
Alipurduar–Silghat Town Rajya Rani Express
Alipurduar–Lumding Intercity Express

References

External links
 

Railway junction stations in Assam
Railway stations in Bongaigaon district
Rangiya railway division
Transport in Bongaigaon